Current sense amplifiers (also called current shunt amplifiers) are special-purpose amplifiers that output a voltage proportional to the current flowing in a power rail. They utilize a "current-sense resistor" to convert the load current in the power rail to a small voltage, which is then amplified by the current-sense amplifiers. The currents in the power rail can be in the range of 1 A to 20 A, requiring the current-sense resistor to be a resistor typically in the range of 1 to 100 mΩ. These amplifiers are designed to amplify a very small "sense voltage" of 10 to 100 mV, in the presence of very large common-mode voltages of 5 to 30 V. DC precision (low input offset voltage) and high common-mode rejection ratio (CMRR) are distinguishing characteristics of these amplifiers. Some current sense amplifiers measure current flowing in a single direction; bidirectional amplifiers measure current flow in both directions through the sense resistor.

Normal differential amplifiers and operational amplifiers powered between two power supply rails (say VCC and VEE) can only handle signals that lie between these two power rails. If a voltage outside the power supply rails is applied to the input, internal ESD protection diodes turn on, causing large currents to flow and damage these parts.

Specialised current-sense amplifiers, by contrast are designed so that, when powered from a low-voltage power rail such as VCC = 5 V and VEE = 0 V, they can withstand pin voltages much higher than VCC and much lower than VEE. These amplifiers use specialized ESD structures that enable them to have this functionality. Their input stages are designed such that when the input common-mode voltage is much higher than VCC or much lower than VEE, the input amplifier stage powers itself from the input common-mode voltage instead of VCC orVEE.

Examples of integrated current-sense amplifiers include INA240, INA293, LTC6101,MAX4080, AD8210,TS1100 and INA193. In special cases, no VCC pin is required to accomplish current-sensing; the MAX9938 is such a device.

See also
 Differential amplifier
 Shunts (electrical)
 Sense Amplifier

References

External links
 Current Sense Amplifier Products
 Current Sensing Overview
High-Side Current-Sense Measurement: Circuits and Principles
Current-Sense Amplifiers (CSAs)
Current Sense Circuits and Applications
Current Sensor Overview

Electronic amplifiers